Mandla Fort railway station is a main railway station in Mandla district, Madhya Pradesh. Its code is MFR. It serves Mandla city. The station consists of two platforms. The platforms are now well sheltered. Mandla was served by a narrow-gauge railway from Nainpur, where it connects to the narrow-gauge line between Jabalpur and Gondia. Gauge conversion has already completed.

References

Railway stations in Mandla district
Nagpur SEC railway division